Tripartite motif-containing protein 68 is a protein that in humans is encoded by the TRIM68 gene.

The protein encoded by this gene contains a RING finger domain, a motif present in a variety of functionally distinct proteins and known to be involved in protein-protein and protein-DNA interactions. This gene is expressed in many cancer cell lines. Its expression in normal tissues, however, was found to be restricted to prostate. This gene was also found to be differentially expressed in androgen-dependent versus androgen-independent prostate cancer cells.

Interactions 

TRIM68 has been shown to interact with Androgen receptor.

References

Further reading